Table Rock was an unincorporated community in Raleigh County, West Virginia, United States. Its post office  no longer exists.

References 

Unincorporated communities in West Virginia
Unincorporated communities in Raleigh County, West Virginia